The 2010 Challenger Salinas Diario Expreso was a professional tennis tournament played on outdoor hard courts. It was part of the 2010 ATP Challenger Tour. It took place in Salinas, Ecuador between 11 and 16 January 2010.

ATP entrants

Seeds

 Rankings are as of December 28, 2009

Other entrants
The following players received wildcards into the singles main draw:
  Júlio César Campozano
  Carlton Fiorentino
  Jan-Michael Gambill
  Emilio Gómez

The following players received entry from the qualifying draw:
  Facundo Bagnis
  Pierre-Ludovic Duclos
  Iván Endara
  Luka Gregorc

The following player received the lucky loser spot:
  Cristóbal Saavedra-Corvalán

Champions

Singles

 Brian Dabul def.  Nicolás Massú, 6–3, 6–2

Doubles

 Jonathan Marray /  Jamie Murray def.  Sanchai Ratiwatana /  Sonchat Ratiwatana, 6–3, 6–4

External links

Draw

Challenger Salinas Diario Expreso
Tennis tournaments in Ecuador
Challenger ATP de Salinas Diario Expreso